The 1916 SAPFL season was the 1st season of the South Australian Patriotic Football League, a competition formed in the absence of the South Australian Football League during World War I. The SAFL was opposed to the formation of the Patriotic League and refused to recognise it during and after World War I. Hindmarsh Oval was the contingency venue for the 1916 SAPFL Grand Final if an agreement with the SACA could not be reached as the Adelaide Oval was the preferred venue of the SAPFL.

Ladder

References

SAFL